Tinissa amboinensis is a moth of the family Tineidae. It was described by Robinson in 1976. It is found in Indonesia (Ambon).

References

Moths described in 1976
Scardiinae